Hartford is a city in Lyon County, Kansas, United States.  As of the 2020 census, the population of the city was 355.

History
Hartford was laid out in 1858. Some of its founders were original natives of Hartford, Connecticut, hence the name.

Hartford was incorporated as a city in March 1884.

Geography
Hartford is located at  (38.307866, -95.956313).

Demographics

Hartford is part of the Emporia Micropolitan Statistical Area.

2010 census
As of the census of 2010, there were 371 people, 160 households, and 98 families residing in the city. The racial makeup of the city was 96.5% White, 0.3% African American, 1.1% Native American, 0.3% Asian, and 1.9% from two or more races. Hispanic or Latino of any race were 2.2% of the population.

There were 160 households, of which 30.6% had children under the age of 18 living with them, 41.3% were married couples living together, 12.5% had a female householder with no husband present, 7.5% had a male householder with no wife present, and 38.8% were non-families. 33.8% of all households were made up of individuals, and 14.4% had someone living alone who was 65 years of age or older. The average household size was 2.25 and the average family size was 2.87.

The median age in the city was 44.6 years. 23.5% of residents were under the age of 18; 8.9% were between the ages of 18 and 24; 18.3% were from 25 to 44; 32.3% were from 45 to 64; and 17% were 65 years of age or older. The gender makeup of the city was 52.3% male and 47.7% female.

2000 census
At the 2000 census, there were 500 people, 200 households and 125 families residing in the city. The racial makeup of the city was 98.20% White, 0.60% African American, 0.40% Native American, 0.60% from other races, and 0.20% from two or more races. Hispanic or Latino of any race were 0.40% of the population.

There were 200 households, of which 33.0% had children under the age of 18 living with them, 51.0% were married couples living together, 9.5% had a female householder with no husband present, and 37.5% were non-families. 33.5% of all households were made up of individuals, and 11.5% had someone living alone who was 65 years of age or older. The average household size was 2.35 and the average family size was 3.06.

26.0% of the population were under the age of 18, 5.8% from 18 to 24, 29.4% from 25 to 44, 24.0% from 45 to 64, and 14.8% who were 65 years of age or older. The median age was 39 years. For every 100 females, there were 104.1 males. For every 100 females age 18 and over, there were 103.3 males.

The median household income was $34,750 and the median family income was $37,212. Males had a median income of $27,212 versus $23,250 for females. The per capita income for the city was $16,014. About 4.6% of families and 9.3% of the population were below the poverty line, including 5.0% of those under age 18 and 7.8% of those age 65 or over.

Education
The community is served by Southern Lyon County USD 252 public school district.

See also
 National Register of Historic Places listings in Lyon County, Kansas
 John Redmond Dam and Reservoir
 Great Flood of 1951

References

Further reading

External links
 Hartford - Directory of Public Officials
 Hartford city map, KDOT

Cities in Kansas
Cities in Lyon County, Kansas
Emporia, Kansas micropolitan area